John L. Jones (December 18, 1899 – death unknown), nicknamed "Nippy", was an American Negro league outfielder between 1922 and 1932.

A native of Texas, Jones made his Negro leagues debut in 1922 with the Detroit Stars. He played seven seasons with the Stars through 1929, and also spent time with the Indianapolis ABCs in 1926. Jones finished his career with a short stint with the Philadelphia Bacharach Giants in 1932.

References

External links
 and Baseball-Reference Black Baseball stats and Seamheads

1899 births
Place of birth missing
Place of death missing
Year of death missing
Bacharach Giants players
Detroit Stars players
Indianapolis ABCs players
Baseball outfielders
Baseball players from Texas